Andrew Hicks (born 10 August 1973) is an English professional snooker player. Nicknamed "The Cream of Devon", Hicks was a semi-finalist at both the World Snooker Championship and UK Championship in 1995, and the same stage at four other ranking tournaments. A Masters semi-finalist in 1996, he was ranked within the world's top 32 players between 1995 and 2000, and again from 2005 to 2007, but was relegated from the main tour in 2013. He regained a two-year tour card in 2019.

Career
Although a professional since 1991, Hicks first came to prominence in the 1995 World Championship, in which he reached the semi-finals, beating Steve Davis, Willie Thorne and Peter Ebdon along the way, but being blocked from the finals by Nigel Bond, 11–16. He has never reached a major final, but reached the semi-finals of the four BBC-screened events within 2 seasons – the 1994 Grand Prix, the 1995 UK Championship and the 1996 Masters (as a wild card).

He spent most of the second half of the 1990s close to the Top-16 elite section in the world rankings, peaking at no. 17 in the 1995/1996 season, and winning the 1997 Masters qualifier. He struggled in the early part of the 2000s, however, winning only two of eighty-three matches in 2003.

Later, he was only one  loss away from being bumped out of the Top 64, rallying to defeat Craig Butler 10–9 in a close 2003 World Championship qualifier. He ended up ranked no. 62 for the 2003/2004 season. At this point, he had only qualified for the world championship once in six years, a 10–4 defeat to eventual winner Ronnie O'Sullivan in 2001. However, he returned to form after this. He reached the second round of the 2004 World Championship, beating Quinten Hann in a match memorable for a near-fight between the two players at the end, started by Hann in the middle of the match, when he said to Hicks: 'I've enjoyed the last three times I've beaten you'. At the end of the match, Hicks retorted that Hann was about to drop out of the Top 16 as a result of the loss. Hicks later admitted his delight at this. He next gave Ronnie O'Sullivan a challenge in the second round, before ultimately losing, 11–13.

In 2004–05, Hicks made it to the quarter-finals of the British Open with a first-round victory over Ken Doherty.

Returning to the Top 32, in the following season he reached the last 32 in four of the six tournaments he entered, and retained his Top 32 status (marginally, at no. 31). He played in the 2006 World Championship, and lost to Steve Davis, 4–10, in the first round.  
Although slipping only a single position in the rankings (from no. 30 to no. 31) for 2006/2007, the year was not truly successful for him, and neither was 2006/2007, resulting in a drop down to the no. 41 position for 2007/2008 world rankings. After failing to qualify for the Welsh Open and China Open, he contemplated retiring if he could not retain a top-64 ranking.

He has compiled over 100 competitive  during his career,  and has scored a maximum break at the UK Championship qualifiers in 2012. Despite winning only one key event, Hicks has career winnings of £562,560 (up to the start of the 2006/2007 season).
He entered Q School in May 2018 in a bid to win back his place on the snooker professional tour.

In June 2019, Hicks came through Q-School - Event 3 by winning six matches to earn a two-year card on the World Snooker Tour for the 2019/2020 and 2020–21 seasons.

Personal life
He currently lives in Launceston, Cornwall and is the staff pro at Bell's Court Snooker Club in Falmouth. His wife Rachel was working there when they met; they married in 2005, and had their first child in 2006. He also plays golf, in a local society named after him.

Performance and rankings timeline

Career finals

Non-ranking finals: 4 (1 title)

Amateur finals: 1

References

External links

Andy Hicks at worldsnooker.com

1973 births
Living people
Sportspeople from Tavistock
English snooker players
People from Launceston, Cornwall